The San Francisco Bay Conservation and Development Commission (BCDC) is a California state commission dedicated to the protection, enhancement and responsible use of the San Francisco Bay. It holds jurisdiction over almost the entirety of the Bay, including the reaches into the Sacramento River, Coyote Creek and the Petaluma River Additionally, the commission oversees the San Francisco Bay Salt Ponds and the Suisun Marsh that connects to the ports of Stockton. BCDC has the authority to administer legal enforcement action and escalate violations of McAteer-Perris Act to the California Attorney General's Office.

History
The Commission was created by California's McAteer-Petris Act, which the legislature passed on September 17, 1965. The legislation was promoted by the Bay Area Council, a local business organization. It is the first regional government entity created for an urban area by legislative action.

The Save San Francisco Bay Association was started by citizens outraged by the dramatic loss of the bay through dikes and landfills as well as pollution.

Coordinating Agencies
BCDC is part of the Bay Area Regional Collaborative which includes the Metropolitan Transportation Commission, Association of Bay Area Governments, and Bay Area Air Quality Management District. This multi-agency regional committee allows for cross-jurisdictional work on projects such as Resilient Bay Area  and Carbon Free Future  In 2020, Commission staff issued a report on the potential impacts of rising sea level.

Their work includes advocacy for a San Francisco Bay Area Water Trail, for beachable nonmotorized watercraft to navigate the bay and also shutting down harbors like Westpoint in Redwood City.

See also

San Francisco Bay Restoration Authority

References

External links
 Official state website, webpage on McAteer-Petris Act.

California Natural Resources Agency
State agencies of California
Environment of the San Francisco Bay Area
Government in the San Francisco Bay Area
San Francisco Bay
San Francisco Bay watershed
Government agencies established in 1965
1965 establishments in California